Samuel Mills (1871 – after 1896) was an English footballer who played in the Football League for Derby County and Woolwich Arsenal.

References

1871 births
Date of death unknown
English footballers
Derby Midland F.C. players
Derby County F.C. players
English Football League players
Arsenal F.C. players
Leicester City F.C. players
Loughborough F.C. players
Heanor Town F.C. players
Footballers from Derby
Association football wingers